The American Music Award for Collaboration of the Year has been awarded since 2015. Years reflect the year in which the awards were presented, for works released in the previous year (until 2003 onward when awards were handed out in November of the same year). The all-time winner in this category are Camila Cabello and Justin Bieber  with 3 wins. Justin Bieber is also the most nominated artist with 6 nominations.

Winners and nominees

2010s

2020s

Category facts

Multiple wins

 3 wins
 Camila Cabello
 Justin Bieber

Multiple nominations

 6 nominations
 Justin Bieber

 3 nominations
 Camila Cabello
 Drake

 2 nominations
 Bruno Mars
 Cardi B
 The Chainsmokers
 Kendrick Lamar
 Lady Gaga
 Megan Thee Stallion
 Rihanna
 Young Thug
 Lil Nas X

References

American Music Awards
Musical collaboration awards
Awards established in 2015